Virginia v. Black, 538 U.S. 343 (2003), was a landmark decision of the Supreme Court of the United States in which the Court held, 5–4, that any state statute banning cross burning on the basis that it constitutes prima facie evidence of intent to intimidate is a violation of the First Amendment to the Constitution. Such a provision, the Court argued, blurs the distinction between proscribable "threats of intimidation" and the Ku Klux Klan's protected "messages of shared ideology". In the case, three defendants were convicted in two separate cases of violating a Virginia statute against cross burning. However, cross-burning can be a criminal offense if the intent to intimidate is proven. It was argued by former Solicitor General of Virginia, William Hurd.

Background 
In cases such as Chaplinsky v. New Hampshire, New York Times Co. v. Sullivan, R.A.V. v. City of St. Paul (1992) and others, the Supreme Court has addressed various areas of controversial speech. The Court has frequently sided with the speakers, but occasionally the Court has sided with the government and acknowledged its (limited) power to pass laws protecting citizens from specific types of harmful speech.

On May 2, 1998, Richard Elliot and Jonathan O'Mara attempted to light a cross on the property of Elliot's neighbor (who was black) in Virginia Beach, Virginia. On August 22, 1998, Barry Black held a Ku Klux Klan rally on private property and with the consent of the owner in Carroll County, Virginia. A neighbor and the county sheriff witnessed the event and heard attendees make many negative comments concerning black people. During the rally a cross was lit. Black was arrested and charged with violating a Virginia statute outlawing cross burnings. All defendants were found guilty. Black's and Elliot/O'Mara's cases were combined upon appeal and reached the U.S. Supreme Court during the Fall 2002 session.

Majority 
Justice Sandra Day O'Connor delivered the opinion stating, "a state, consistent with the First Amendment, may ban cross burning carried out with the intent to intimidate." In so doing, the Court considered the speech to be constitutionally unprotected "true threats." Under that carve-out, "a State may choose to prohibit only those forms of intimidation that are most likely to inspire fear of bodily harm."

In Virginia v. Black the Court found that Virginia's statute against cross burning is unconstitutional with respect to the text in the statute that states "Any such burning of a cross shall be prima facie evidence of an intent to intimidate a person or group of persons." This text in particular was found to be unconstitutional as it violates the Fourteenth Amendment insofar as it provides the presumption, that the act of cross burning is evidence of the intent to intimidate. In Sandstrom v. Montana, 442 U.S. 510, 99 S. Ct. 2450, 61 L. Ed. 2d 39 (1979), the Court held when a jury is instructed in such a manner where; the law presumes a person intends the ordinary consequences of his voluntary acts, [the jury] may have interpreted the presumption as conclusive or as shifting the burden of persuasion, and because either interpretation would have violated the Fourteenth Amendment's requirement that the state prove every element of a criminal offense beyond a reasonable doubt, the instruction given was unconstitutional.
In essence, the Fourteenth Amendment prevents a jury instruction when that instruction includes: a presumption, that shifts the burden of persuasion with regards to an essential element of the crime away from the state and onto the defendant, in a criminal trial. Thus, the Fourteenth Amendment was violated by the text of the statute where the intent to intimidate was presumed from the action of cross burning.

However, the Court found the statute constitutional with regards to the language limiting cross burning with the intent to intimidate as a valid conduct restriction as the regulation was: within the constitutional power of the government, where the conduct regulation furthers an important government interest and such government interest is unrelated to the suppression of speech, and the incidental burden (secondary effect) on speech is no greater than necessary. By structuring the language of the statute to restrict conduct only with the intent to intimidate, the Virginia legislature satisfied all three prongs of the O'Brien test (see United States v. O'Brien, 391 U.S. 367 (1968)). The limitation of the conduct was within the constitutional power of the government based on the First Amendment exception known as the "true threats" doctrine. The conduct restriction furthered an important government interest that was unrelated to the suppression of speech, because, "cross burning done with the intent to intimidate has a long and pernicious history as a signal of impending violence." Virginia v. Black, 538 U.S. 343, 123 S. Ct. 1536, 1539, 155 L. Ed. 2d 535 (2003). Finally, the secondary effect on speech was no greater than necessary as it restricted the conduct only when accompanied by the intent to intimidate.

It is important to distinguish the Virginia statute from a similar statute which was held facially unconstitutional for overbreadth in R.A.V. v. City of St. Paul, Minn., 505 U.S. 377, 112 S. Ct. 2538, 120 L. Ed. 2d 305 (1992).

Dissents and Concurrences 
Justice Clarence Thomas argued that cross-burning itself should be a First Amendment exception, as others have argued regarding flag-burning (see Chief Justice William Rehnquist’s dissenting opinion in Texas v. Johnson), due to the historical association of cross-burning with terrorism. "[T]his statute," Thomas wrote, "prohibits only conduct, not expression. And, just as one cannot burn down someone's house to make a political point and then seek refuge in the First Amendment, those who hate cannot terrorize and intimidate to make their point."

Justice David Souter argued that cross-burning, even with the proven intent to intimidate, should not be a crime under the R.A.V. v. City of St. Paul precedent because of "the statute’s content-based distinction."

See also
List of United States Supreme Court cases, volume 538
List of United States Supreme Court cases by the Rehnquist Court
List of United States Supreme Court cases involving the First Amendment

References

External links
 

United States Supreme Court cases
United States Supreme Court cases of the Rehnquist Court
United States Free Speech Clause case law
Hate crime
2003 in United States case law
Legal history of Virginia